Joel Burgunder (born 20 May 1991) is a Swiss sprinter competing primarily in the 400 metres. He represented his country at three consecutive European Championships. He also won a gold medal in the 4 × 400 metres relay at the 2017 Jeux de la Francophonie

International competitions

Personal bests
Outdoor
100 metres – 10.54 (+1.3 m/s, Winterthur 2014)
200 metres – 20.84 (+1.5 m/s, Langenthal 2016)
400 metres – 46.00 (Zürich 2017)
Indoor
60 metres – 6.80 (Magglingen 2013)
200 metres – 21.55 (Magglingen 2013)
400 metres – 49.17 (St. Gallen 2015)

References

1991 births
Living people
Swiss male sprinters
European Games competitors for Switzerland
Athletes (track and field) at the 2019 European Games
21st-century Swiss people